Hacılar is a village in the Lachin District of Azerbaijan.

References 

Populated places in Lachin District
Villages in Azerbaijan